Chris Strikes is a Canadian filmmaker. He is best known for his 2022 short documentary Patty vs. Patty, received a Canadian Screen Award nomination for Best Short Documentary at the 11th Canadian Screen Awards in 2023.

Career 
Chris Strikes is a Jamaican-Canadian filmmaker based in Toronto. He began his career in the west-end of the city, shooting music videos for local artists. His work gained attention and his first music video by Ron Dias called "Toronto" played on Much Music and received a lot of praise, thus leading him to work with top Canadian and international artists such as Nelly Furtado, Kardinal Offishall, Machel Montano, and Dexta Daps.

As Strikes honed his skills behind the camera, he began to write, produce, and direct short narratives. His first short film, "One night a stranger", was screened at Cannes and other festivals around the world, winning awards for Best Music Video. This was followed by "Agape" written by frequent collaborator Director Ron Dias and starring and Emmanuel Kabongo. His next short film "Housekeeping", two more short films that also made it around the festival circuit, featuring up and coming Canadian actors such as Brandon Mcknight (CW The Flash).

Strikes’ first feature-length documentary, "Becoming A Queen", which provides an insider's view of Toronto's annual Caribbean Carnival and the King and Queen Show. The film has been well-received and serves as an educational piece for the youth and community, accurately portraying the most joyous time in the city.

Strikes’ cultural identity is at the heart of his storytelling, evident from his early work to his present projects. His promising future in the film industry is a testament to his talent and passion for the craft.

Strikes latest CBC short doc "Patty vs. Patty" was received extremely well 
The film was nominated for Best Short Film at the 2022 Directors Guild of Canada awards.
.

Filmography 
 One night a Stranger (2013) - short film
 Agape (2014) - short film
 Housekeeping (2016) - short film
 Whole Lotta Love (2017) - short film
 Burning Rubber (2020) - short film
 Becoming a Queen (2021) - feature film documentary
 Patty vs. Patty (2022) - short doc film

References

Year of birth missing (living people)
Living people
Canadian filmmakers